The Dalecarlian alphabet consists of 32 letters, 25 derived from the Swedish alphabet, and seven additional letters: vowels with an ogonek diacritic, denoting nasality: (Ąą, Ęę, Įį, Ųų, Y̨y̨, and Ą̊ą̊) as well as the consonant Ðð (eð), denoting voiced dental fricative, as 'th' in 'father'. The letters Cc, Qq, Xx and Zz are only used in names and foreign words. The alphabet is used for Elfdalian and for other Dalecarlian dialects. The language up until recently and on a small scale today is written with Dalecarlian runes.

Description

All except Ą̊ and ą̊ are available as characters in the Unicode standard. Ą̊ and ą̊ can be produced by Ą or ą and a combining mark "Ring Above" (U+030A)

References
 Älvdalsk ortografi 2015-07-10.
Omniglot: Elfdalian alphabet 2015-07-10.

External links
Älvdalskt tangentbord Elfdalian Keyboard (in Swedish)

See also
Old Norse alphabet
Dalecarlian runes

Latin alphabets
North Germanic languages
Languages of Sweden

sv:Älvdalska#Det älvdalska alfabetet